Takelot was the name of three Egyptian pharaohs:

Takelot I - 887-874 BC
Takelot II - 840-815 BC
Takelot III - 774–759 BC